The UK Singles Chart is the official record chart in the United Kingdom. In the 1970s, it was compiled weekly by the British Market Research Bureau (BMRB) on behalf of the British record industry with a one-week break each Christmas. Prior to 1969 many music papers compiled their own sales charts but, on 15 February 1969, the BMRB was commissioned in a joint venture by the BBC and Record Retailer to compile the chart. BMRB compiled the first chart from postal returns of sales logs from 250 record shops. The sampling cost approximately £52,000 and shops were randomly chosen and submitted figures for sales taken up to the close of trade on Saturday. The data was compiled on Monday and given to the BBC on Tuesday to be announced on Johnnie Walker's afternoon show and later published in Record Retailer (rebranded Music Week in 1972). However, the BMRB often struggled to have the full sample of sales figures returned by post. The 1971 postal strike meant that data had to be collected by telephone but this was deemed inadequate for a national chart, and by 1973 the BMRB was using motorcycle couriers to collect sales figures.

In terms of number-one singles, ABBA were the most successful group of the decade having seven singles reach the top spot. The longest duration of a single at number-one was nine weeks and this was achieved on three occasions: "Bohemian Rhapsody" by Queen in 1975; "Mull of Kintyre" / "Girls' School" by Wings in 1977 and "You're the One That I Want" by John Travolta and Olivia Newton-John in 1978. Thirteen records were released that sold over one-million copies within the decade and "Mull of Kintyre" also became the first ever single to sell over two-million copies. In doing so it became the best-ever selling single beating the benchmark set by The Beatles' song "She Loves You"  in 1963. "Mull of Kintyre" was also the biggest selling song of the decade and was not surpassed in physical sales until 1984 when Band Aid released "Do They Know It's Christmas?".

In 1973, the British Phonographic Industry (BPI) was formed and they began certifying the sales of records at certain thresholds: "silver" (250,000 units), "gold" (500,000 units), and "platinum" (1,000,000 units). In 1977, the BPI held an awards ceremony at Wembley Conference Centre to mark the Silver Jubilee of Elizabeth II. The event cost £25,000, honoured music from the last 25 years and is considered to be the first Brit Awards ceremony.

Number-one singles

By artist
The following artists achieved three or more number-one hits during the 1970s. Swedish group, ABBA, were the most successful artist of the decade in terms of number-one singles. They had seven number-ones: "Waterloo" (1974); "Mamma Mia", "Fernando" and "Dancing Queen" (all 1976); "Knowing Me, Knowing You", "The Name of the Game" (both 1977); and "Take a Chance on Me" (1978).

By record label
The following record labels had five or more number ones on the UK Singles Chart during the 1970s.

Million-selling and platinum records
In April 1973, the British Phonographic Industry began classifying singles and albums by the number of units sold. The highest threshold is "platinum record" and was then awarded to singles that sold over 1,000,000 units. Thirteen records were classified platinum in the 1970s and two number-one songs from the 1970s were classified as platinum in the subsequent decade. Slade's "Merry Xmas Everybody" subsequently sold over one-million copies but in 1985, after sales from its re-release were included.

Two other songs originally released in the 1970s became platinum and become million selling records but both were number-ones in a subsequent decade after being re-released: "Imagine" by John Lennon charted at number six in 1975 but reached number one in 1981 following Lennon's death at the end of the previous year and Tony Christie's "(Is This The Way To) Amarillo" reached number eighteen in 1971 but later took top spot after being re-released as a charity single in 2005. Five number-ones – ABBA's "Dancing Queen", Ian Dury and The Blockheads' "Hit Me with Your Rhythm Stick", The New Seekers' "I'd Like to Teach the World to Sing (In Perfect Harmony)", Julie Covington's "Don't Cry for Me Argentina" and Pink Floyd's "Another Brick in the Wall (Part II)" – passed the million-sales mark following the introduction of music downloads in 2004.

Songs with the most weeks at number one 
The following songs spent at least six weeks at number one during the 1970s.

Notes

References

Further reading
 Davis, Sharon. Every Chart-Topper Tells a Story: The Seventies. Edinburgh: Mainstream Publishing, 1998 , 430p.

1970s
1970s in British music
United Kingdom Singles